"Susie Cincinnati" is a song by the American rock band the Beach Boys that was recorded during the sessions for their 1970 album Sunflower. It was written by Al Jardine about a female cab driver from Ohio.

Background
Al Jardine stated in a 2022 interview, "'Susie Cincinnati' is kind of a jab at The Beatles, a 'Drive My Car' kind of thing, I enjoyed that. There wasn’t so much a rivalry with The Beatles, more of an appreciation. With Brian it might have been competition but myself, I enjoyed their work a lot."

Recording
"Susie Cincinnati" was recorded at the Beach Boys' Bel Air studio on December 24, 1969 and January 7, 1970. The automobile sound effects were recorded on February 2, 1970.

Release
The song was first issued in February 1970 as the B-side of the "Add Some Music to Your Day" single, and then again in December 1974 as the B-side of the "Child of Winter (Christmas Song)" single. In 1976, it was included as a track on the album 15 Big Ones. Brian Wilson included it on the LP "because it's a good song", although Dennis Wilson felt that it was a "silly piece of shit".

Personnel
Per liner notes.

The Beach Boys
 Al Jardine – lead and backing vocals, guitar
 Bruce Johnston – backing vocals
 Mike Love – backing vocals
 Brian Wilson – backing vocals, harmonica, bass
 Carl Wilson – backing vocals, guitar
 Dennis Wilson – backing vocals

Session musicians
 Daryl Dragon – clavinet
 Dennis Dragon – drums

References
Citations

Bibliography

External links
 
 
 
 

1970 songs
The Beach Boys songs
Songs written by Al Jardine
Song recordings produced by Brian Wilson